Rupwal (or Roopwal) is one of the oldest and historic towns of Chakwal District in the Punjab Province of Pakistan. It is located at 33°2'48N 72°31'47E.

Rupwal was a "GHALLA MANDI" 100 years ago and there was also a defence road from Rawalpindi to Tala Gang which is now not able to use. It was also well known for dog fighting & Kabaddi 30 years ago. It is located north west of the district Chakwal, Chakwal Talagang Road, insert a Link Road of Balkaser, distance of 19 km and other Link Road "Dharrabi Village" Distance of 13 km. Distance from Islamabad (Capital) is about 115 km East-West and about 45 km from "Chakkri" interchange via towns "Neela Dulha". Present District Nazim Chakwal "Sardar Ghulam Abbas" is from Kot Choudharian which is mostly and locally called as "KOT ROOPWAL".

References

Chakwal District
Populated places in Chakwal District